Judaicum may refer to :

The Institutum Judaicum was a special academic course for Protestant theologians who desired to prepare themselves for missionary work among Jews.
Bellum Judaicum is a book written by the 1st century Jewish historian Josephus.